The Enragés (French for "enraged ones") commonly known as the Ultra-radicals were a small number of firebrands known for defending the lower class and expressing the demands of the extreme radical sans-culottes during the French Revolution. They played an active role in the 31 May – 2 June 1793 Paris uprisings that forced the expulsion of the Girondins from the National Convention, allowing the Montagnards to assume full control. The Enragés became associated with this term for their angry rhetoric appealing to the National Convention to take more measures that would benefit the poor. Jacques Roux, Jean-François Varlet, Jean Théophile Victor Leclerc and Claire Lacombe, the primary leaders of the Enragés, were strident critics of the National Convention for failing to carry out the promises of the French Revolution.

The Enragés were not a unified party, rather the individual figureheads that comprised the group identified as the Enragés worked for their own objectives and evidence of cooperation is inconclusive. As individual political personalities, the Enragés had anarchist-like tendencies; being suspicious of most political organizations and individuals, while resisting ties to others. The leaders did not view themselves as part of a cohesive movement, with Roux even calling for Varlet's arrest at one point. The notion of the Enragés as a cohesive group was perpetuated by the Jacobins as they lumped their critics Leclerc and Roux into one group.

Primary demands 
In 1793, Jacques Roux delivered a speech at the National Convention known as the Manifesto of the Enragés that represents the essential demands of the group. He asserted that freedom and equality were thus far "vain phantoms" because the rich had profited from the French Revolution at the expense of the poor. To remedy this, he proposed measures for price controls, arguing: "Those goods necessary to all should be delivered at a price accessible to all". He also called for strict punishments against actors engaged in speculation and monopoly. He demanded the National Convention take severe action to repress counterrevolutionary activity, promising to "show them [enemies] those immortal pikes that overthrew the Bastille". Lastly, he accused the National Convention of ruining the finances of the state and encouraged the exclusive use of the assignats to stabilize finances.

Formation 
The Enragés formed in response to the Jacobin's reluctance to restrain the capitalist bourgeois. Many Parisians feared that the National Convention protected merchants and shopkeepers at the expense of the sans-culottes. The Enragés, though not a cohesive body, offered the working poor a platform to express their dissent. Their dissent was often conveyed through riots, public demonstrations and passionate oratory.

Jacques Roux and Jean-Francois Varlet emboldened the Parisian working poor to approach the Jacobin Club on 22 February 1793 and persuade them to place price controls on necessary goods. The Enragés appointed two women to represent the movement and their agenda to the National Convention. However, the National Convention refused to grant them an audience. This provoked outrage and criticism throughout Paris and some went as far as to accuse the National Convention of protecting the merchant elite's interests at the expense of the sans-culottes. Further attempts for the Enragés to communicate their position were denied by the National Convention. Determined to be heard, they responded with revolt. They plundered the homes and businesses of the merchant elite, employing direct action to meet their needs. The Enragés were noted for using legal and extra legal means to achieve their ends.

The Enragés were composed of members within the National Convention and the sans-culottes. They illuminated the internal and external war waged by the sans-culottes. They complained that the National Convention ordered men to fight on the battlefield without providing for the widows and orphans remaining in France. They emphasized the unavailability of basic necessities, particularly bread. In his Manifesto of the Enragés, Jacques Roux colorfully expressed this sentiment to the National Convention, stating: "Is it necessary that the widows of those who died for the cause of freedom pay, at the price of gold, for the cotton they need to wipe away their tears, for the milk and the honey that serves for their children?".

They accused the merchant aristocracy of withholding access to goods and supplies to intentionally drive up prices. Roux demanded that the National Convention impose capital punishment upon unethical merchants who used speculation, monopolies and hoarding to increase their personal profits at the expense of the poor. The Enragés labeled price gouging as counter-revolutionary and treason. This sentiment extended to those who sympathized with the recently executed King Louis XVI. They felt that those who sympathized with the monarchy would also sympathize with those who hoarded goods. It is not surprising that many within the Enragés actively worked against the Girondin faction and indeed they contributed to the demise of the moderate Girondins, who had fought to spare the king. Those who adhered to the ideologies presented in the Manifesto of the Enragés wished to emphasize to the National Convention that tyranny was not just the product of monarchy and that injustice and oppression did not end with the execution of the king. In their view, oppression existed whenever one stratum of society sought to monopolize the majority of resources while simultaneous preventing others from gaining access to those same resources. In their view, the pursuit of resources was acceptable, but the act of limiting access to resources was punishable by death.

The Enragés called on the National Convention to restrict commerce that it might not "consist of ruining, rendering hopeless, or starving citizens". While the Enragés occasionally worked within political structures, their primary objective was achieving social and economic reform. They were a direct action group, attempting to meet the immediate needs of the working poor.

Women in the Enragés 
Jean-Francois Varlet understood the enormous influence women possessed, particularly within the French Revolution. Varlet formed the Enragés by provoking and motivating working poor women and organizing them into a semi-cohesive mobile unit. The Enragés often appointed women as speakers to represent the movement in the National Convention. Revolutionary proto-feminists held vital positions within the Enragés, including Claire Lacombe and Pauline Léon. The proto-feminists of the French Revolution are credited with inspiring feminist movements in the 19th century.

Key leaders

Jacques Roux 
Jacques Roux, a Roman Catholic priest, was the leader of the Enragés. Roux supported the common people and the Republic. He participated in peasant movements and endorsed the Civil Constitution of the Clergy, to which he swore an oath on 16 January 1791. Roux claimed: "I am ready to give every last drop of my blood to a Revolution that has already altered the fate of the human race by making men equal among themselves as they are all for all eternity before God". Roux saw violence as a key to the French Revolution’s success and in fact when Louis XVI was executed it was Roux who led him to the scaffold.

Jean Varlet 
Jean Varlet, another leader of the Enragés, played a leading role in the fall of the monarchy. When Louis XVI attempted to flee Paris, Varlet circulated petitions in the National Assembly and spoke against the king. On 10 August 1792, the Legislative Assembly suspended the king and called for the election of a National Convention. Afterwards, Varlet became a deputy in the new National Convention. Even as a member of this representative government, Varlet mistrusted representation and favored direct universal suffrage which could bind representatives and recall elected legislators. He sought to prevent the wealthy from expanding their profits at the expense of the poor and called for the nationalization of all profits obtained through monopoly and hoarding.

Théophile Leclerc 
In 1790, Théophile Leclerc joined the first battalion of Morbihan volunteers and remained a member until February 1792. He gained recognition in Paris through a speech attacking Louis XVI to the Jacobins. After moving to Lyon, he joined the Central Club and married Pauline Léon, a revolutionary woman. He approved of radical violence like the other Enragés, calling for the execution of expelled Girondins after the 2 June insurrection.

Claire Lacombe 
In 1793, the actress Claire Lacombe, another individual associated with the Enragés, founded the Society of Revolutionary Republican Women. This group was outraged by high costs of living, the lack of necessities and awful living conditions. Lacombe was known for violent rhetoric and action. On 26 May 1793, Lacombe nearly beat to death a Girondin woman, Théroigne de Méricourt, with a whip on the benches of the Convention. She may have killed her if Jean-Paul Marat had not intervened.

Other groups 
To the left of the Montagnards and Hébertists, the Enragés were fought against by Maximilien Robespierre and Jacques Hébert, both of whom implemented some of their proposals in order to appeal to the sans-culottes and undermine the Enragés influence. Their ideas were taken up and developed by Gracchus Babeuf and his associates.

Another group styling itself as Enragés emerged in France in 1968 among students at Nanterre University. Inspired by, and closely allied with, the Situationists, these Enragés emerged as one of the leading groups in the May 1968 French insurrection.

References

Further reading 
 Hanson, Paul R. (2007). The A to Z of the French Revolution. Lanham, Maryland: Scarecrow Press, Inc.
 Giles, David (2003). "Représentation et souveraineté chez les Enragés (1792-1794)". In Le concept de Représentation dans la pensée politique. Presses universitaires d'Aix-Marseille.
 Guérin, Daniel (1977). Class Struggle in the First French Republic. Translated by Ian Patterson. London: Pluto Press.
 Leclerc, Théophile (2001). L'Ami du Peuple (1793). No. II. ed. Marc Allan Goldstein. New York: Lang.
 Mathiez, Albert (January 1977). "Les Enragés Et La Lutte Pour Le Maximum". Annales Révolutionnaires 9. pp. 456–483.
 Morris, Brian (1990). "The Sans-Culottes and the Enragés - Liberation Movements within the French Revolution". In The Anarchist Papers 3. Black Rose Books Ltd. pp. 132–152.
 Popkin, Jeremy D. (2015). A Short History of the French Revolution. Hoboken, New Jersey: Pearson Education, Inc.
 Richet, Denis (1989). "Enragés". In Critical Dictionary of the French Revolution. ed. François Furet and Mona Ozouf. Harvard University Press.
 Rose, R. B. (1965). The Enragés: Socialists of the French Revolution?. Sydney: Sydney University Press.
 Roux, Jacques (1793). "Manifesto of the Enragés". Translation by Mitchell Abidor. Marxist Internet Archive.
 Slavin, Morris (1961). "Left of the Mountain: The Enragés and the French Revolution". Ph.D. diss. ProQuest. UMI Dissertations Publishing.
 Varlet, Jean-François (1793). "Declaration of the Rights of Man in the Social State". Translation by Mitchell Abidor. Marxist Internet Archive.
 Jean, Juares (2015). "The Enragés Against the High Cost of Living". In A Socialist History of the French Revolution. Pluto Press. JSTOR j.ctt183p2pt.15.

 
1789 establishments in France
1794 disestablishments in France
Anarchism
Far-left politics in France
French socialists
Groups of the French Revolution
Left-wing populism in France
Political parties established in 1789
Political parties disestablished in 1794
Radical parties in France
Socialism
Socialist parties in France